Yu Xingwu (1896–1984) was a Chinese philologist and exegesis interpreter. He was born in Haicheng, Liaoning, and graduated from Shenyang National Normal School in 1919. During the 1930s and 1940s he was a professor at Peking University, Yenching University and Fu Jen Catholic University, and from 1955 he taught at People's University of Northeast China (today's Jilin University).

Yu is mainly known for his textual research of Oracle bone script and Bronze script. He also spent much time on interpreting pre-Qin classics. After 1950s, Yu also published several papers about pre-Qin social history.

References

Linguists from China
Chinese archaeologists
Academic staff of Fu Jen Catholic University
Academic staff of Peking University
Academic staff of Yenching University
Academic staff of Jilin University
Educators from Liaoning
1896 births
1984 deaths
Writers from Liaoning
People from Haicheng, Liaoning
Scientists from Liaoning
20th-century Chinese translators
Chinese palaeographers
20th-century archaeologists
20th-century linguists